Verdi Lake is a glacial tarn in the Ruby Mountains of Elko County, Nevada, United States. It is within the Ruby Mountains Wilderness, which is administered by the Ruby Mountains Ranger District of the Humboldt-Toiyabe National Forest. Directly to the south rises Verdi Peak.

Verdi Lake is unusual in two respects. It is the highest lake in the Ruby Mountains, and is therefore the last to thaw out in the spring. Also, it does not normally have a surface outlet. Lake water seeps into the soil and emerges as a spring several hundred yards down Talbot Canyon. This is the major source of flow to Talbot Creek, which after exiting the mountains passes near the community of Lamoille, merges with Lamoille Creek, which then meanders down Lamoille Valley and merges with the main branch of the Humboldt River.

References

Ruby Mountains
Lakes of Nevada
Lakes of Elko County, Nevada
Lakes of the Great Basin
Humboldt–Toiyabe National Forest